The Henbury Loop Line, also known as the Filton to Avonmouth Line, is a railway line following the boundary between Bristol and South Gloucestershire between the Severn Beach Line at Hallen Marsh Junction, Avonmouth and the Cross Country Route/South Wales Main Line at Filton. It is currently only used for freight.

History
The line was opened on 9 May 1910, as a more direct route to Avonmouth docks, and was initially known as the Avonmouth and Filton Railway. Although the line was mainly intended for freight services, passenger services were also provided until 1915, with stations at Filton Halt, Charlton, Henbury and Hallen. In 1917 a small station was opened at Chittening Platform to serve a new factory. The line was fully reopened to passenger traffic in 1922. Filton Halt, Charlton and Hallen stations did not reopen, but in 1926 a new station, North Filton Platform, was opened on the site of Filton Halt. The line closed to passenger traffic in 1964.

In 1971 a curve was opened to link the line to the South Wales Main Line at Patchway. This was to facilitate traffic to and from South Wales, including zoo excursions to Clifton Down.

Reopening

FOSBR suggest this would help services along the Severn Beach Line, allowing a -- service, and also provide services to the north of Bristol generally, the Cribbs Causeway shopping centre, and the redevelopment at Filton Aerodrome. South Gloucestershire Council planning committee recommended in 2011 that the line be re-opened for passenger services.

A consultation document produced for the West of England Partnership by the Halcrow Group suggested passenger services use the line as a spur.

A one-off service, operated by First Great Western, ran on the line on 27 July 2013. Work on restoring four-track use on Filton Bank was completed in late 2018.

In October 2022 the opening of a new station, North Filton, on the line was pushed back to 2026.

This line has been identified by Campaign for a Better Transport as a candidate for reopening.

References

Rail transport in Bristol
Transport in South Gloucestershire District
Railway lines in South West England
Standard gauge railways in England